Eberhard Feltz (born 27 June 1937) is a German classical violinist and chamber music pedagogue. Feltz became internationally known especially as a mentor for string quartets and chamber music ensembles. He is often called the "guru of the string quartet".

Life 
Feltz was born in Königsberg in 1937. His family was expelled from Königsberg in 1945 after the end of the war. Feltz began playing the violin at the age of seven. He studied violin in Berlin with Werner Scholz, later in St. Petersburg with Michail Waiman. 

Feltz began to teach violin and chamber music in 1963 at the Hochschule für Musik "Hanns Eisler". In 1985, he was appointed professor for violin and chamber music. Feltz is in great demand as a lecturer for chamber music master classes. He is a regular guest at festivals such as the one in Davos or the Heidelberger Frühling. Feltz often assumes responsibility on juries of chamber music competitions such as the Felix Mendelssohn Bartholdy Hochschulwettbewerb of the Prussian Cultural Heritage Foundation in Berlin.

As a mentor of chamber music ensembles, Feltz initially supported the Vogler Quartet, later the Berlin Kuss Quartet and Atrium Quartet, the Dutch Rubens Quartet and the German-Estonian Schumann Quartet. In addition, he took care of the French Quatuor Ébène and the Amsterdam Busch Trio, among others.

Sources

References

External links 
 

German classical violinists
German music educators
1937 births
Living people
Musicians from Königsberg